The women's 10,000 metres competition of the athletics events at the 2011 Pan American Games took place on the 24 of October at the Telmex Athletics Stadium. The defending Pan American Games champion is Sara Slattery of the United States.

Records
Prior to this competition, the existing world and Pan American Games records were as follows:

Qualification
Each National Olympic Committee (NOC) was able to enter up to two entrants providing they had met the minimum standard (35.30.00) in the qualifying period (January 1, 2010 to September 14, 2011).

Schedule

Abbreviations
All times shown are in minutes:seconds

Results
8 athletes from 6 countries competed.

Final

References

Athletics at the 2011 Pan American Games
2011
2011 in women's athletics